The 1900 United States presidential election in Washington took place on November 6, 1900. All contemporary 45 states were part of the 1900 United States presidential election. State voters chose four electors to the Electoral College, which selected the president and vice president.

Washington was won by the Republican nominees, incumbent President William McKinley of Ohio and his running mate Theodore Roosevelt of New York. A return to prosperity, continued American expansion in the Philippines, and the fading of the Populist revolt of the previous decade ensured that incumbent President McKinley would not have any trouble carrying the state.

McKinley had previously lost Washington to Bryan four years earlier while Bryan would later lose the state to William Howard Taft in 1908.

Results

Results by county

See also
 United States presidential elections in Washington (state)

Notes

References

Washington (state)
1900
1900 Washington (state) elections